Associação Desportiva de Valongo is a roller hockey club from Valongo, Portugal.

Current Squad

Honours

International competitions 
 WSE Continental Cup: 1
 2022–23

Domestic competitions 
Portuguese First Division: 1
2013–14
Portuguese Super Cup: 1
2014

 Portuguese Second Division: 4
 1983–84, 1985–86, 1988–89, 1996–97

B Team 
 Portuguese Third Division: 1
 2018–19

References

External links

Rink hockey clubs in Portugal

Roller hockey